The Kennedy–Martin–Stelle Farmstead is located at 450 King George Road in Bernards Township of Somerset County, New Jersey. The  farmstead was added to the National Register of Historic Places on May 5, 2004 for its significance in architecture, education and politics/government from 1762 to 1852. The farmstead includes four contributing buildings and two contributing structures. It is now the home of the Farmstead Arts Center.

History
In 1762, Reverend Samuel Kennedy of the Presbyterian Church in Basking Ridge purchased the farm from Moses Doty. He advertised a sale of the property for June 17, 1767, and by the late 1770s, Colonel Ephraim Martin became the owner. Martin was an American Revolutionary War soldier and New Jersey legislator. He sold the farm  to Oliver and Samuel Stelle, stepsons of his wife, . Oliver Stelle became the sole owner and remained here until his death in 1832, with his son Clarkson Stelle inheriting it.

Description
The farmhouse is a one and one-half story frame building with a gable roof. The oldest part was built in the 18th century with Dutch Colonial style. The English barn was built in two parts, an 18th century large frame barn and an extension added .

See also
 National Register of Historic Places listings in Somerset County, New Jersey

References

External links
 
 

Bernards Township, New Jersey		
National Register of Historic Places in Somerset County, New Jersey
Farms on the National Register of Historic Places in New Jersey
New Jersey Register of Historic Places